Jesús Zárate (born 5 October 1974) is a Mexican former profssional cyclist. He competed in the men's time trial at the 1996 Summer Olympics.

Major results
1993
 2nd  Team time trial, Central American and Caribbean Games
1998
 1st  Road race, National Road Championships
 1st Stage 1 Vuelta y Ruta de Mexico
1999
 5th First Union Invitational
2001
 1st Stage 3 Tour of the Gila
2002
 10th San Francisco Grand Prix
2003
 2nd  Time trial, National Road Championships
2005
 1st Stage 8 Vuelta Ciclista a Costa Rica
2006
 2nd Overall Vuelta a Chihuahua
2007
 1st Stage 8 Vuelta a Cuba

References

External links
 

1974 births
Living people
Mexican male cyclists
Olympic cyclists of Mexico
Cyclists at the 1996 Summer Olympics
Place of birth missing (living people)
Pan American Games medalists in cycling
Pan American Games silver medalists for Mexico
Cyclists at the 1995 Pan American Games
Medalists at the 1995 Pan American Games